2010 was the third competitive season for the Cairns based Skill360 Northern Pride Rugby League Football Club. They competed in the QRL state competition, the Intrust Super Cup. 12 clubs competed, with each club playing 22 matches (11 home and 11 away) over 25 weeks.

David Maiden was appointed as the Pride's new coach. In the latter half of the season the Pride won 11 consecutive matches and finished in fourth place. They made the Grand Final, beating Norths Devils 30–20 at Suncorp Stadium to become Premiers. Captain Chris Sheppard won the Duncan Hall Medal for his man-of-the-match performance in the Grand Final, which was his last game before retirement.

2010 Season –  Skill360 Northern Pride

Staff
 Coach: David Maiden
 Assistant coaches: David Westley & Cameron Miller
 Team captain: Chris Sheppard
 Club captain: Ben Laity
 Chief executive: John Moore
 Chairman: Bob Fowler
 Operations manager: Chris Sheppard

 Competition: Wizard Queensland Cup

2010 Player awards
 Cairns Post most improved player – Noel Underwood
 Cairns Colonial Club Resort best back – Brett Anderson
 Taxsmart best forward – Mark Cantoni
 Skytrans players' player – Ben Laity
 QCCU John O’Brien club person of the year – Cameron Miller
 Skill360 Australia player of the year – Joel Riethmuller
 Duncan Hall Medal Winner – Chris Sheppard

2010 player gains
  Ryan Stig from NRL Newcastle Knights
  Brett Anderson from NRL Melbourne Storm
  Brenton Bowen from NRL Gold Coast Titans
  Jaiman Lowe from NRL South Sydney Rabbitohs – Lowe was released mid-season after resigning with the Rabbitohs after Ben Ross's season ended after a neck injury.
  Theeran Pearson from NYC Newcastle Knights Under 20s
  Jay Aston from Queensland Cup Norths Devils
  Mark Dalle Cort from Super League Celtic Crusaders
 Ben Fitzpatrick from CDRL Brothers (Cairns)
 Freddie Fauid from CDRL Brothers (Cairns)
 Nick Obodin from CDRL Brothers (Cairns)
 Taputoa Sonny Rea from CDRL Kangaroos RLFC
 Ben Spina from TDRL Herbert River Crushers
 Aisea Namoa

Player losses after 2009 season
  Tom Humble to Parramatta Eels 
  Germaine Paulson to Burleigh Bears 
  Hezron Murgha (out for the year for knee surgery)
  Richie Marsters to TDRL Tully Tigers
  Gordon Rattler to MDRL Souths Mackay
  Adam Mills (released)
  Callan Myles (released)
  Josh Vaughan (released)
  Luke Harlen (released)
  Luke Millwood (released)
  Chris Riesen

2010 Season Launch
 Saturday 6 March 2010, 9.00am-11.00am – Airfirst, 124 Anderson Street, Manunda.

Pre Season Boot Camp
 Undara, Saturday 23 & Sunday 24 January 2010.

Grand Final Premiers Presentation
 Tuesday 21 September 2010, 4.00pm Cairns Esplanade. Cairns Regional Council Mayor Val Schier presented the Northern Pride with a commemorative plaque.

2010 Jerseys

Special playing strips
NAIDOC Week black jersey designed by Kevin Edmondston (Aboriginal) and Joey Laifoo (Torres Strait Islander) and worn in Round 16, Friday 9 July 2010 at Barlow Park for the game against the Ipswich Jets.

Trial Matches

Intrust Super Cup matches

Ladder

Finals Series

2010 Northern Pride players

North Queensland Cowboys who played for the Northern Pride in 2010

2010 Televised Games
In 2010 games were televised by ABC TV and shown live across Queensland through the ABC1 channel at 2.00pm (AEST) on Saturday afternoons. The commentary team was Gerry Collins, Warren Boland and David Wright.
 1: Northern Pride lost 16–22 : Round 5, Saturday 10 April 2010 against Ipswich Jets from North Ipswich Reserve, Ipswich
 2: Northern Pride lost 14–26 : Round 10, Saturday 22 May 2010 against Norths Devils from Bishop Park, Nundah
 3: Northern Pride won 54–6 : Round 22, Saturday 28 August 2010 against Burleigh Bears from Pizzey Park, Miami, Gold Coast
 4: Northern Pride won 28–8 : Semi-Final, Sunday 12 September 2010 against Souths Logan Magpies from Davies Park, West End, Brisbane
 5: Northern Pride won 30–20 : Grand Final, Sunday 19 September 2010 against Norths Devils from Suncorp Stadium, Brisbane

References

External links
 Northern Pride Official site
 Northern Pride Facebook Page
 Northern Pride Twitter Page
 Northern Pride YouTube Page
 2010 Northern Pride photo gallery – Cairns Post
 2010 Northern Pride match video highlights

Northern Pride RLFC seasons
Northern Pride
Northern Pride